Princess María de la Esperanza Amalia Raniera María Rosario Luisa Gonzaga of Bourbon-Two Sicilies (14 June 1914, Madrid, Spain – 8 August 2005, Villamanrique de la Condesa, Spain) was the youngest daughter of Prince Carlos of Bourbon-Two Sicilies and his wife Princess Louise of Orléans. Maria Esperanza's husband Prince Pedro Gastão of Orléans-Braganza, was one of two claimants to the Brazilian throne, and head of the Petrópolis branch of the Brazilian Imperial House. Maria Esperanza was also an aunt of Juan Carlos I of Spain, son of her sister Princess Maria Mercedes of Bourbon-Two Sicilies.

Marriage and issue
Maria Esperanza married Prince Pedro Gastão of Orléans-Braganza (19 February 1913 in Eu - 27 December 2007 in Villamanrique de la Condesa), son of Prince Pedro de Alcântara of Orléans-Braganza and Countess Elisabeth Dobržensky de Dobrženicz, on 18 December 1944 in Seville, Spain. Maria Esperanza and Pedro Gastão had six children:

Prince Pedro Carlos of Orléans-Braganza (born 31 October 1945 in Rio de Janeiro)
 ∞ married Rony Kuhn de Souza (20 March 1938 in São Paulo – 14 January 1979 in Petrópolis), daughter of Alfredo Kuhn de Souza and Maria das Gravas Mercedes de Souza, on 2 September 1975 in Petrópolis, with issue:
Pedro Tiago de Orléans e Bragança (born 12 January 1979 in Petrópolis), Prince Imperial of Brazil according to supporters of the Petrópolis branch's claim
 ∞ Patrícia Alexandra Braumeyer Branscombe (22 November 1964 - 21 November 2009 in Petrópolis), daughter of Frank Branscombe and Maria Braumeyer, on 16 July 1981 in Fazenda Sáo Geraldo, with issue:
Felipe de Orléans e Bragança (born 31 December 1982)
Princess Maria da Glória of Orléans-Braganza (born 13 December 1946 in Petrópolis)
 ∞ Alexander, Crown Prince of Yugoslavia (born 17 July 1945 at Claridge's in London), son of Peter II of Yugoslavia and Princess Alexandra of Greece and Denmark, on 1 July 1972 in Villamanrique de la Condesa, divorced on 19 February 1985, with issue:
Prince Peter of Yugoslavia (born 5 February 1980 in Chicago)
 Dolores Karageorgevich (born in 2017)
Philip, Hereditary Prince of Yugoslavia (born 15 January 1982 in Falls Church)
 ∞ Danica Marinković (born 1986 in Belgrade), daughter of painter Milan "Cile" Marinković and his wife, Zorica "Beba" Krupež, on 7 October 2017 in Belgrade, with issue:
Prince Stefan of Yugoslavia (born 25 February 2018 in Belgrade)
Prince Alexander of Yugoslavia (born 15 January 1982 in Falls Church)
 ∞ Ignacio de Medina y Fernández de Córdoba, 19th Duke of Segorbe and 20th Count of Rivadavia (born 23 February 1947 in Seville), son of Rafael de Medina y Vilallonga and Victoria Eugenia Fernández de Córdoba, 18th Duchess of Medinaceli, on 24 October 1985 in Seville, with issue.
Sol de Medina y Orléans-Braganza, 54th Countess of Ampurias (born 8 August 1986 in New York City)
Luna de Medina y Orléans-Braganza, 17th Countess of Ricla (born 4 May 1988 in New York City)
Prince Afonso of Orléans-Braganza (born 25 April 1948 in Petrópolis)
 ∞ Maria Juana Parejo y Gurruchaga (born 13 May 1954 in Seville), daughter of Isidro Parejo and Maria Vitória Gurruchaga, on 3 January 1973 in Seville, divorced in 1998, with issue:
Maria de Orléans-Braganza (born 4 January 1974 in Seville)
Julia de Orléans-Braganza (born 18 September 1977 in Petrópolis)
 ∞ Silvia-Amália Hungria de Silva Machado (born 29 July 1953 in Rio de Janeiro) on 19 November 2002 in Petrópolis
Prince Manuel of Orléans-Braganza (born 17 June 1949 in Petrópolis)
 ∞ Margarita Haffner y Lancha (born 10 December 1945 in Málaga), daughter of Oskar Haffner, on 12 December 1977 in Málaga, divorced in 1995, with issue:
Luiza de Orléans-Braganza (born 25 July 1978 in Seville)
Manuel de Orléans-Braganza (born 7 March 1981 in Seville)
Princess Cristina of Orléans-Braganza (born 16 October 1950 in Petrópolis)
 ∞ Prince Jan Pawel Sapieha-Rozanski (born 26 August 1935 in Warsaw, Poland), son of Prince Jan Andrzej Sapieha-Rozanski, on 16 May 1980 in Petrópolis, divorced in 1988, with issue:
Princess Ana Teresa Sapieha-Rozanski (born 25 May 1981 in Petrópolis)
Princess Paola Sapieha-Rozanski (born 26 April 1983 in London)
 ∞ Prince Constantin Swiatopolk-Czetwertyński (born 20 February 1978 in Brussels), in 2012
Prince Francisco of Orléans-Braganza (born 9 December 1956)
 ∞ Christina Schmidt-Peçanha (born 14 January 1953), daughter of Gaubert Schmidt and Alice Peçanha, on 28 January 1978 in Petrópolis, divorced, with issue:
Francisco de Orléans-Bragança (born 25 September 1979 in Petrópolis)
Maria Isabel de Orléans-Bragança (born 1982), who was born after her father's second marriage
 ∞ Rita de Cássia Ferreira Pires (born 1961) in 1980, with issue:
Gabriel de Orléans-Bragança (born 1989)
Manuela de Orléans-Bragança (born 1997)

Honours
  Calabrian House of Bourbon-Two Sicilies Knight Grand Cross of Justice of the Calabrian Two Sicilian Order of Saint George
 : 1173rd Dame of the Order of Queen Maria Luisa

Arms

Ancestry

References

The Imperial Family of Brazil
Elisabeth Dobrzensky von Dobrzenicz “Empress of Brazil”

|-

1914 births
2005 deaths
Nobility from Madrid
Princesses of Bourbon-Two Sicilies
House of Orléans-Braganza